Raja Cheyyi Vesthe is a 2016 Indian Telugu-language action thriller film directed by debutante Pradeep and produced by Sai Korrapati under Varahi Chalana Chitram. The film stars Nara Rohit, Taraka Ratna and Isha Talwar in the lead roles. It was dubbed into Hindi as Encounter Raja.

Plot

Raja Ram (Nara Rohit) is an aspiring film maker who thinks to defeat the enemy not through muscle power but through brain power. He loves a girl called Chaitra (Isha Talwar), an orphan who has a secret motive and doesn't show any interest in him.

One day Raja gets a message from a producer who is interested in making a film with him. But he puts some conditions to him, for example, he wants to kill a gangster turned businessman Manik (Taraka Ratna). Raja is suspicious about the message and about the producer, who he didn't see. Then he thinks creatively and finds out that a cop and his friend Subhash (Shashank) is behind in the letter, then he came to know that Chaitra is the master mind of this entire plot. Then Chaitra tells her story to him. When she was a kid, Manik killed her parents accidentally and says sorry formally, and left. To avenge their death after having grown up, her brother Chakri (Srinivas Avasarala) tries to kill him. All attempts fail, and he is caught by Manik and dies brutally. After hearing Chaitra's story, Raja decides to help her and makes a plan to kill Manik. Meanwhile, Chaitra falls for Raja and accepts his love. Raja's mother decides to make arrangements for their wedding.

Then in a private party, honest SP (Sivaji Raja), who is working against Manik, was insulted by a minister who supports Manik, and Manik slaps him in front of everyone. Then at home, Manik observes a common point in his group photos, i.e., he found out Chakri and Chaitra's photos along with him who is following him. Then he understands everything and decides to kill Chaitra. After the plan was leaked by one of his friends, Ravi (Ravi Varma), to Manik for a ransom, Manik tries to kill him, but Ravi tricks him and escapes with the money. But he becomes loyal to Manik and tells him the whereabouts of Raja. Later it is revealed that Ravi is a loyal friend to Raja; actually, it is his plan to trap Manik. Then Manik chases Chaitra to kill her. Raja rescues her, and a fight ensues between them in that area. With the help of his friends, Raja kills all his henchmen, and Manik kills his friend, a junior artist. Then in a final combat, all people give the weapons to Raja in the fight with Manik. Raja kills Manik in the end. Police listed the case is in pending then it is revealed that Raja is the son of none other than the SP who was slapped by Manik in the private party. And who supported him in the fight with Manik is who wants to take revenge on Manik for the death of their beloved persons. 

Finally, the film ends with Raja started to work on a direction department and aspires his dream.

Cast
Nara Rohit as Raja Ram
Taraka Ratna as Manik
Isha Talwar as Chaitra
Srinivas Avasarala as Chakri
Shashank as Police Officer Subhash
C. V. L. Narasimha Rao
Sivaji Raja as SP
Rajeev Kanakala as Chaitra's father
Ravi Varma as Ravi
Raghu Karumanchi as Raja Ram's friend
Viva Harsha as Raja Ram's friend
Sivannarayana Naripeddi as Church Father (cameo)

Soundtrack 
Yevare Nee Premaku - DhanunjayKottu Kottu - Sai Charan, Sai Karthik, Shashaa TirupathiNeethone -Sai Charan, Sai KarthikChudara Itu ChudaraThillu,Geethu,Swetha P, Jayaram P, Saatvik G, Sriya Madhuri
Chinnari Thalli - Shruthi
Raja Cheyyi Vesthe - Simha, Divija Karthik

References

External links
 

2016 films
Indian action thriller films
Films shot in Telangana
Films shot in Tamil Nadu
2010s Telugu-language films
Films about contract killing in India
Indian films about revenge
2016 directorial debut films
2016 action thriller films
Vaaraahi Chalana Chitram films
Films scored by Sai Karthik